Takayus simplicus is a species of comb-footed spider in the family Theridiidae. It is found in China.

References

Theridiidae
Spiders described in 2012
Spiders of China